The Rural City of Seymour was a local government area about  north of Melbourne, the state capital of Victoria, Australia.

History

Seymour was incorporated as a road district on 5 May 1863, and became a shire on 24 February 1871. It lost a part of its area to the Shire of Yea on 15 May 1907. On 2 November 1993, Seymour was proclaimed a rural city.

On 18 November 1994, the Rural City of Seymour was abolished, and along with the Shires of Broadford and Pyalong, and parts of the Shire of McIvor, was merged into the newly created Shire of Mitchell. The Avenel district was transferred to the newly created Shire of Strathbogie.

Wards

The Rural City of Seymour was divided into four ridings, each of which elected three councillors:
 Avenel Riding
 Seymour North Riding
 Seymour South Riding
 Tallarook Riding

Towns and localities
 Avenel
 Mangalore
 Northwood
 Seymour*
 Tallarook
 Whiteheads Creek

* Council seat.

Population

* Estimate in the 1958 Victorian Year Book.

References

External links
 Victorian Places - Seymour

Seymour